Polje pri Vodicah is a village south of Vodice in the Upper Carniola region of Slovenia.

Name
The name of the settlement was changed from Polje to Polje pri Vodicah in 1955. In the past the German name was Pole.

References

External links

Polje pri Vodicah on Geopedia

Populated places in the Municipality of Vodice